Spike and Mike's Festival of Animation is a presentation of award-winning animated short films, annually touring throughout theaters, film festivals or college campuses in the United States.

Background
The festival premieres annually in the La Jolla (Village) neighborhood seated in San Diego, California then tours to theatres, film festivals, and college campuses currently in about a dozen North American cities.

 The Festival of Animation, later renamed the Classic Festival of Animation, was the original format, started in 1977, and continued into the early 2000s.
 The Sick and Twisted Festival of Animation started in 1990 and runs alongside the original festival (which was renamed the Classic festival in this context), becoming the sole festival in the early 2000s as the Classic festival was phased out.
 The New Gen (Generation) Animation Festival was introduced in February 2010, and the latest show show distributed along with the Sick and Twisted. "For years now I've had films that didn't quite fit into the Sick and Twisted category, films that are more sophisticated and artistic, - high production value, over-the-top humorous and really an introduction on what's moving into the pop cult landscape." - Spike

History
Mellow Manor Productions, Inc. was founded by Craig "Spike" Decker and Mike Gribble, known as "Spike & Mike" in Riverside, California in the 1970s as a means of promoting rock bands and special screenings of horror films as well as movie classics. It was named after Riverside's notorious Victorian house "The Manor" where Spike, Mike, and many others lived in a communal set. The Manor was the original flagship and production house of the Festival. After spending mid-1977 giving out flyers for the Fantastic Animation Festival, they focused on presenting a flight of animated films and booking the Festival of Animation in venues across the country, which eventually becoming a 50 city tour.

The Sick and Twisted Festival of Animation began in 1990 at Wheeler Auditorium at UC Berkeley. This is an unrated, adult version of the regular program mainly featuring satyric, non sequitur and gross-out cartoons. In the Festival's early days, Spike and Mike took the stage, introduced the films in ringmaster style.  balloons were volleyed into fan seating before showtime to burn off street energy. The reel header was flanked by a bagpipe and drum battle march over a cartoon of Spike's Scottish Terrier on screen wreaking havoc on the titles. The dog took the stage and was driven to shred objects.

Before the Festival of Animation, it was difficult to see independent, experimental, and foreign animation. Spike and Mike went on yearly worldwide film hunting expeditions. They signed on animation from the National Film Board of Canada, Cal Arts, Sheridan, Royal College of Art, Annecy, Zagreb, Hiroshima, Ottawa and select studios active among the art-house scene that did not have a public venue. In the 1990s, Spike and Mike screened early films from animators including Nick Park, Marv Newland, Tim Burton, Barry Purves, John Lasseter, Andrew Stanton, and Will Vinton.

The shows have toured in theaters, film festivals such as (Cannes, Sundance, Annecy), college campuses, and dynamic events such as the Vans Warped Tour, the Winter X Games, ComiCon, and with the nu-metal band Korn.

Initially, Spike and Mike produced the Classic Festival and later both the Classic and Sick and Twisted simultaneously. But by the early 2000s, the Classic Festival of Animation was put on hiatus in favor of the Sick and Twisted Festival. Spike and Mike's New Gen Show was created in place of the Classic Festival to show films that did not fit into the category of "sick and twisted".

A select set of the short films in the festival were produced at Mellow Manor, some partially and others in-full. Artists' conceptualized or unfinished elements were often accepted for financial and pipeline assistance in completing production. Some stages of an artist's production were contracted out for specialized work.

Mike Gribble died from cancer in August 1994, and Spike continues to produce touring theatrical festivals of animated short film collections.

Contributors
In the 1990s, Spike and Mike showed work from animators such as Craig McCracken, Miles Thompson, Danny Antonucci, Dave Smith, Steve Fonti, Craig Kellman, and Mike Judge. Several films under Spike and Mike's Mellow Manor Productions were funded either partially or entirely from concept to completion (such as Mike Judge's first Beavis and Butthead films). Working beyond their initial projects, many of these artists have become prominent in the industry and independent creatives, commercial artists, painters, screenwriters, and designers. Several have become nominated for or won honors including Oscars, Emmys, and Annie Awards.

Danny Antonucci (creator of The Brothers Grunt and Ed, Edd n Eddy): Lupo the Butcher
Don Hertzfeldt: Ah L'amour, Genre, Lily and Jim, Billy's Balloon, Rejected
Mike Judge: (creator of Beavis and Butt-Head and King of the Hill): "Frog Baseball", and "Peace, Love & Understanding"
Bill Plympton: Your Face, 25 Ways to Quit Smoking, Nose Hair, and Eat
Craig McCracken (creator of The Powerpuff Girls, Foster's Home for Imaginary Friends, Wander Over Yonder, and Kid Cosmic): No Neck Joe
Marv Newland: Bambi Meets Godzilla
Matt Stone and Trey Parker (creators of South Park): The Spirit Of Christmas
Nick Park (creator of Wallace And Gromit): Creature Comforts, A Close Shave
Breehn Burns (creator of Dr. Tran)
 Kenn Navarro  (creator of Happy Tree Friends)
Eric Fogel (creator of Celebrity Deathmatch): Mutilator
John Lasseter (director of Toy Story): Red's Dream, Tin Toy
Andrew Stanton (director of Finding Nemo and WALL-E): A Story, Somewhere in the Artic
Pete Docter (animator, director, and writer of Up, Monsters, Inc., Inside Out and Soul): Winter, Palm Springs, Next Door
 Alison Snowden and David Fine (creators of Bob and Margaret): Bob's Birthday
 John A. Davis (creator of The Adventures of Jimmy Neutron, Boy Genius): Nanna & Lil' Puss Puss
 Chris Wedge (director of Ice Age): Bunny

See also 

 International Tournée of Animation, also popular in the late 80s-early 90s
 List of international animation festivals
 The Animation Show, contemporary North American collection
 Nicktoons Film Festival
 Animation Show of Shows
 Fantastic Animation Festival

References

Sources 

 Jerry Beck. Outlaw Animation: Cutting-Edge Cartoons from the Spike and Mike Festivals,  Harry N. Abrams, p. 6–152.

Further reading

External links 
Animation Outlaws, a documentary about the festival
Animation Outlaws homepage

Animation duos
Animation film festivals in the United States
Experimental film festivals
Animation compilation
Film festivals established in 1977
Defunct film festivals in the United States
1970s in animation
1980s in animation
1990s in animation
2000s in animation